David William Ratcliff (born 1937) is an Anglican priest and former Archdeacon of Scandinavia and Germany.

He was educated at Edinburgh Theological College and was ordained in 1963. After curacies in Croydon and Selsdon, he was Vicar of Milton Regis from 1969 to 1975. He worked in the Diocese of Canterbury's Education Department from 1975 to 1991 before serving as a chaplain in Frankfurt and Stockholm between 1991 and 2002.

He was also Archdeacon of Scandinavia and Germany from 1996 until his retirement in 2005.

Notes

1937 births
Alumni of Edinburgh Theological College
Archdeacons of Scandinavia and Germany
Living people
People from the Borough of Swale